Graham Rathbone (22 August 1942 – 8 January 2012) was a Welsh professional footballer.

Rathbone was born in Newport, Monmouthshire.  A centre-half, he began his career with Merthyr Tydfil. In 1960, he joined Newport County and made 191 appearances for the club, scoring 7 goals. In 1966 manager Jimmy McGuigan signed him at Grimsby Town for a £10,000 fee where he made 233 appearances before moving to Cambridge United and Kettering Town.

Honours

Grimsby Town
Division Four: Champions 1971–72

References

1942 births
2012 deaths
Welsh footballers
Footballers from Newport, Wales
Merthyr Tydfil F.C. players
Newport County A.F.C. players
Grimsby Town F.C. players
Cambridge United F.C. players
Kettering Town F.C. players
English Football League players
Association football defenders
Deaths from dementia in Wales